General elections were held in East Germany on 20 October 1963. They were to originally be held in November 1962 but were postponed. 434 deputies to the Volkskammer were elected, with all of them being candidates of the single-list National Front, dominated by the communist Socialist Unity Party of Germany.

Results

References

 Dieter Nohlen, Dolf Sternberger, Bernhard Vogel and Klaus Landfried (Ed.). Die Wahl der Parlamente und anderer Staatsorgane. Herausgegeben von Dolf Sternberger und Bernhard Vogel. Redaktion von Dieter Nohlen Band I: Europa. Berlin: Verlag Walter de Gruyter & Co. 1969. p. 376.
 Cyril Edwin Black and Ernst Christian Helmreich. Twentieth Century Europe: A History. New York: Knopf. 1972. p. 677.

1963 in East Germany
Elections in East Germany
Germany
1963 elections in Germany
October 1963 events in Europe
Election and referendum articles with incomplete results